WILLA Literary Award honors outstanding literature featuring women's stories, set in the Western United States, published each year. Women Writing the West (WWW), a non-profit association of writers and other professionals writing and promoting the Women's West, underwrites and presents the nationally recognized award annually.

The award is named in honor of Pulitzer Prize winner Willa Cather, one of the country's foremost novelists. The awards are presented at the WWW Fall Conference.

Recipients

References

External links
 WILLA Literary Award
 Women Writing the West (WWW)

American literary awards
Willa Cather
Western United States in fiction
Organizations for women writers